Oxyurichthys viridis is a species of goby found in the western central Pacific near the Philippines.

References

Herre, A.W.C.T., 1953. Check list of Philippine fishes. Res. Rep. U.S. Fish Wild. Serv. (20):1-977. 

viridis

Fish of the Pacific Ocean
Fish of the Philippines
Taxa named by Albert William Herre
Fish described in 1927